Causeway Point is the seventh largest suburban shopping mall in Singapore. It is operated by Frasers Property. Causeway Point is located in the town centre of Woodlands, a town in the North of Singapore. Completed in 1998, it is located beside the Woodlands MRT station and the underground Woodlands Bus Interchange. It has 250 retail outlets spread over five floors and a basement.

History
Causeway Point was completed in November 1998 as the first major shopping mall to open in Woodlands, therefore officially opened on 30 May 1999. Back then, it had a 10 screen cineplex operated by Studio Cinemas, which was taken over by Cathay as the former went bust, and was reduced to 7 screens in 2001, John Little and Metro department stores, a Cold Storage supermarket, a Courts store and more than 250 specialty shops. 

In late 2010, Causeway Point underwent a $72 million facelift lasting 30 months. These renovation works were aimed to increase net property income by 22 per cent to $51.5 million. During these renovation works, it added a dry playground on the 2nd floor and a wet playground on the 7th floor. The dry playground was demolished in late 2019. As of 2021, the wet playground is closed until further notice. The main food court was relocated from the 5th floor to the 4th floor as part of its tenant remixing works. John Little vacated the mall shortly before renovation works commenced and was replaced by newer stores. Major tenants include Cathay Cineplexes,  FairPrice Finest, Metro, Food Republic, Cantine by Kopitiam, Cotton On, Courts, Rubi Shoes, Sephora and Uniqlo.

See also
 List of shopping malls in Singapore
 Northpoint City
 Sun Plaza

References

External links
 

Shopping malls in Singapore
Woodlands, Singapore
1998 establishments in Singapore